Norrbotten County or Region Norrbotten held a regional council election on 9 September 2018, on the same day as the general and municipal elections.

Results
The number of seats remained at 71 with the Health Care Party winning the most seats at 27, overtaking the Social Democrats at 23, after having trailed the Social Democrats by eight seats in 2014. The Health Care Party became the first party to supplant the Social Democrats as the largest party in any election in Norrbotten in the post world-war era. The party received 34.7% compared to 29.6% for the Social Democrats.

Municipalities

Images

References

Elections in Norrbotten County
Norrbotten